The Liberian People's Party (LPP) is a political party in Liberia.

LPP formed in 1983 as the electoral wing of the Movement for Justice in Africa (MOJA), a leftist pan-African group. Party member Amos Sawyer served as President of the Interim Government of National Unity (IGNU) in 1990–94.

In elections held on 19 July 1997, the LPP presidential candidate and veteran leader Togba-Nah Tipoteh won 1.61% of the vote. The party won 1 out of 64 seats in the House of Representatives and none in the Senate. While international observers deemed the polls administratively free and transparent, they noted that it had taken place in an atmosphere of intimidation because most voters believed that former rebel leader and National Patriotic Party (NPP) candidate Charles Taylor would return to war if defeated.

In the 11 October 2005 elections, the Liberian People's Party and the United People's Party participated as part of the Alliance for Peace and Democracy (APD), supporting Togba-Nah Tipoteh for president.

In the 2011 presidential and legislative elections, both parties were part of the National Democratic Coalition, backing Dew Mayson for president. In the same elections Togba-Nah Tipoteh ran for the Freedom Alliance Party of Liberia (FAPL).

Pan-Africanism in Liberia
Political parties in Liberia
Pan-Africanist political parties in Africa